Edoardo de Martin is an Italian bobsledder who competed in the late 1960s. He won a silver medal in the two-man event at the 1967 FIBT World Championships in Alpe d'Huez.

References
Bobsleigh two-man world championship medalists since 1931

Italian male bobsledders
Possibly living people
Year of birth missing (living people)